Michael Tribaco Kempter (born 12 January 1995) is a professional footballer who plays as a full-back for Swiss Super League club St. Gallen. Born in Switzerland, he represents the Philippines national team. He began his career at FC Zürich and had played for the Swiss youth national teams.

Club career

Zürich
Kempter, a product of the Zürich youth academy, made his league debut for the club on 24 April 2016 in a 3–0 away defeat to Young Boys, coming on as an 81st minute substitute for Vinícius Freitas. He scored his first competitive goal for the club on 10 April 2017 in a 5–2 away victory in the league over Le Mont. His goal, scored in the 54th minute, made the score 5–0 to Zürich.

In June 2017, Kempter suffered a rupture of the cruciate ligament. He was out until March 2018 and only one month later, he got injured again and had to get a surgery. On 1 February 2019, Kempter was relegated to the U-21 squad. In August 2020 his contract was not renewed.

Neuchâtel Xamax
In September 2020, Kempter signed a one-year deal with Swiss Challenge League club Neuchâtel Xamax.

St. Gallen
In July 2021, it was reported that Kempter was on trial with Swiss Super League club St. Gallen. Kempter played friendlies against Rheindorf Altach and Stuttgart. After a convincing pre-season,  Kempter signed a two-year deal with St. Gallen.

International career
Kempter was born in Schlieren, Switzerland to a Swiss father and a Filipina mother from Pasay. As such, he was eligible to represent both Switzerland and Philippines.

Switzerland youth
Kempter has represented Switzerland at under-19 to under-20 levels.

Philippines
Kempter confirmed his decision to represent the Philippines in 2018, but didn't receive his first call-up until June 2019 ahead of a friendly against China PR as the process to secure eligibility documents delayed the switch. He made his debut on 7 June 2021 in a World Cup and Asian Cup qualifier against China PR. In the 14th minute, his nose was elbowed in a controversial challenge from Tang Miao, and he had to be taken off the pitch. Tang was not booked for the incident, and a disappointed coach Scott Cooper confronted referee Kim Hee-gon at halftime, who allegedly claimed that Kempter "broke his own nose".

Career statistics

Club

References

External links

1995 births
Living people
People from Schlieren, Switzerland
Citizens of the Philippines through descent
Association football defenders
Filipino footballers
Philippines international footballers
Swiss men's footballers
Switzerland youth international footballers
Filipino people of Swiss descent
Swiss people of Filipino descent
FC Zürich players
FC St. Gallen players
Swiss Super League players
Sportspeople from the canton of Zürich